The 2014 Rutgers Scarlet Knights football team represented Rutgers University–New Brunswick in the 2014 NCAA Division I FBS football season. The Scarlet Knights played their home games at High Point Solutions Stadium in Piscataway, New Jersey in their inaugural year as a member of the Big Ten Conference, having played the previous year in the American Athletic Conference. They were led by third year head coach Kyle Flood. They finished the season 8–5, 3–5 in Big Ten play to finish in a tie for fourth place in the East Division. They were invited to the Quick Lane Bowl where they defeated North Carolina.

Previous season
The Scarlet Knights played the 2013 season in the American Athletic Conference.

Coaching staff

Schedule

Game summaries

Washington State

Michael Batlan is the game referee.

Howard

Penn State

Navy

Tulane

Michigan

Ohio State

Nebraska

Wisconsin

Indiana

Michigan State

Maryland

Rutgers had the biggest comeback in school history, being down 35-10 towards the end of the first half.

North Carolina–Quick Lane Bowl

References

Rutgers
Rutgers Scarlet Knights football seasons
Quick Lane Bowl champion seasons
Lambert-Meadowlands Trophy seasons
Rutgers Scarlet Knights football